The 1998 NBA All-Star Game was the 48th edition of the National Basketball Association (NBA) All-Star Game. The event was held at Madison Square Garden in New York City. The East won the game 135–114. Besides the NBA All-Star game, there were two other events that occurred in the All-Star Weekend including the Rookies Game and the Three-Point Shootout.

Summary

Coaches
The Western Conference was coached by George Karl from the Seattle SuperSonics and the Eastern Conference was coached by Larry Bird of the Indiana Pacers.

Players
This would be the All-Star debut of Kobe Bryant, who became the youngest All-Star in NBA history at 19 years of age. It would also be the debut for rookie Tim Duncan. Bryant had a team-high 18 points. Michael Jordan earned MVP honors, scoring 23 points, grabbing six rebounds, and dishing out eight assists. This was Jordan's third MVP award. The game featured four all-stars from the Los Angeles Lakers. 

This was the first All-Star game to feature both Kobe Bryant and Michael Jordan. Jordan would come out of retirement once more in 2001 and play two more seasons (earning All-Star selections both years) for the Washington Wizards. In 1998, Michael Jordan led all the players in All-Star Game votes with 1,028,235 votes from the fans. This was also the first year that Shaquille O'Neal was able to play in the All-Star Game as a member of the Los Angeles Lakers as he was sidelined in 1997 due to a knee injury.

This would be the last All-Star Game until 2000, as a labor dispute caused the following season to be shortened. A total of 10 players from this game would not play in another All-Star Game: Nick Van Exel, Mitch Richmond, Vin Baker, Penny Hardaway, Shawn Kemp, Tim Hardaway, Steve Smith, Glen Rice, Rik Smits and Jayson Williams.

Roster

Game

Grant Hill and Michael Jordan shot the best field goal percentages this game when comparing players who shot ten or more shots. Grant Hill was 7/11 from the field and he knocked down a three (.636%). Michael Jordan was 10/18 from the field and he also knocked down one three (.556%). 

The halftime show featured the Broadway All-Stars.

Boxscore

Eastern Conference

Western Conference

Rookies Game 
The NBA Rookies game took place on the Friday before the All-Star Game. The coaches of the teams were Willis Reed for the East and Dave DeBusschere for the West. The East would win their consecutive rookies game as Zydrunas Ilgauskas, the Cleveland Cavalier's center became the first international player to be recognized as the game's MVP. The final box score of the 1998 NBA Rookies was 85-80 for the East.

Eastern Conference

Western Conference

Three - Point Shootout 
The 3 Point shootout was held during the NBA All-Star Saturday. Eight players were selected to compete, all from different teams. There were three rounds in which the four top players will advance to the semifinal round and the top two in the semifinals will advance to the final round. Jeff Hornacek, Hubert Davis, Dale Ellis, and Charlie Ward advanced to the semifinals with Jeff Hornacek and Hubert Davis competing in the finals. In the end, it was Jeff Hornacek who won the 3 Point Shootout.  

 Hornacek and Ellis tied during the semifinals and were given an extra 30-second round to break the tie.

References

External links
 1998 NBA All Star Game Box Score
 1998 NBA Rookie Challenge Game Box Score
 1998 NBA All Star Game Recap and Box Score
 1998 NBA All Star Game Coverage
 1998 NBA All Star Game Weekend Coverage  

National Basketball Association All-Star Game
All-Star
Sports in Manhattan
NBA All-Star Game
NBA All-Star Game
Basketball competitions in New York City
1990s in Manhattan